Lautenbach is a municipality in the district of Ortenau in Baden-Württemberg, Germany. It has a Gothic pilgrimage church, Mariä Krönung.

References

Ortenaukreis